Uncharted Waters is a 1990 video game published by Koei.

Gameplay
Uncharted Waters is a game in which player captains seek great trade wind routes and the major currents. The story is set in the early 16th century. It was released on the PC-88 in May, 1990.

Reception
Dave Arneson reviewed the game for Computer Gaming World, and stated that "in the final analysis, Uncharted Waters is mildly interesting as it stands. When compared to what it could have been, it is more than mildly disappointing. Someone may yet design the "ultimate" game of 16th century exploration, but it isn't here yet." In a 1993 survey of pre 20th-century strategy games the magazine gave the game two stars out of five, stating that while its geography was inaccurate and user interface "could bear improvement", "Game play can be interesting".

Reviews
All Game Guide - 1998
Computer Gaming World - Jun, 1993
GamePro (Dec, 1994)
ASM (Aktueller Software Markt) (Feb, 1993)

References

1990 video games
Age of Discovery video games
Classic Mac OS games
DOS games
Koei games
MSX games
NEC PC-8801 games
Naval video games
Nintendo Entertainment System games
Sega Genesis games
Super Nintendo Entertainment System games
Trade simulation games
Video games about pirates
Video games developed in Japan
Video games featuring female protagonists
Video games set in the 16th century